Misty Stone is an American pornographic actress and nude model. She was the Penthouse Pet of the Month for December 2014.

Career
She entered the adult film industry in 2006 at the age of around 20 and has appeared in over 300 movies. According to The Root, she is known as the "Halle Berry of the porn industry" because of her crossover appeal. Stone stated in a 2014 interview that she "fell into" working in the adult film industry, but later chose to make a career of it because she wanted to be the best at what she was doing. She also tried a variety of looks early on in her career to create a unique appeal for her audience. She describes the look that she chose as "afro-centric '70s" and inspired by actress Pam Grier.

Stone has stated that she enjoys acting, but did not have the opportunity to indulge it until she was cast as Denise Huxtable in the 2009 parody Not the Cosbys XXX. She went on to star in the 2011 Hustler’s Untrue Hollywood Stories: Oprah parody as the title character of Oprah Winfrey and in 2013 as Mel B (a.k.a. Scary Spice) in the Spice Girls parody OMG... It's the Spice Girls XXX Parody.

Also in 2013 Stone co-hosted the XRCO Award ceremonies with Ed Powers followed by co-hosting the Nightmoves awards with Ron Jeremy. Stone was also nominated in several categories for the award including Porn Star of the Year, Sexiest Adult Star, Porn's Best Body, and Porn's Perfect Sex Couple (girl/girl).

In February 2014 Stone announced that she was working on appearing in mainstream productions and that, going forward in the adult film industry, she would only perform scenes in the girl/girl and solo genres. In March 2014, she began filming for a production titled I Thought You Were A Nice Man, the first of three film projects.

Stone was selected to be the December 2014 Penthouse Pet of the Month. Her pictorial was shot by glamour photographer Holly Randall and she was also featured on the cover. Stone stated about her selection as a Penthouse Pet, "It's more than an honor to be crowned the Penthouse Pet for December, it's surreal . . ." "I think by being crowned the Penthouse Pet of the Month shows that the world is changing, and change is good, and all things are possible."

Advocacy
Stone has been outspoken about the unequal treatment of ethnic performers in the adult industry. She stated in a 2014 interview that it was a standard practice that ethnic performers be paid less and that the practice was even upheld by ethnic-based production companies.

Mainstream appearances
Stone also appeared in the role of Dawn in the Cinemax series, Co-Ed Confidential. She also appeared in the VH1 reality show Basketball Wives. In 2013 Stone voiced a character in the video game Grand Theft Auto V.

In 2013, Stone was one of the featured actresses in the documentary film and accompanying fine art book by Deborah Anderson, Aroused. The film features 16 female pornographic performers, released in cinemas in the U.S. in the summer of 2013 and internationally in January 2014.

Stone was among the pornographic actresses who appeared in the welcome home party scene for Jax Teller after his release from prison in the Season 7 premiere of Sons of Anarchy, which aired on September 9, 2014. She has also had a variety of minor roles in television movies and feature films such as the fantasy scifi Sexy Warriors (2014), the cable series Zane's the Jump Off (2013), and the Joseph Gordon-Levitt and Scarlett Johansson romantic comedy Don Jon (2013).

Other ventures
In 2013, she launched her own production company, Misty Stone Productions. She also produces and sells a line of organic beauty products that include a body butter candle. Her body has also been molded for the creation of a line of sex toys. Stone is the first African-American performer to be molded by the company that manufactures the Fleshlight.

Personal life
Stone is a Los Angeles native, stating that she was "born and raised" in Inglewood, but spent some time living in Omaha, Nebraska. She states in a 2014 interview that she was "not sexually open" when she was younger and considered herself a tomboy. Stone played basketball in high school.

Stone voted for Barack Obama in the 2008 United States presidential election and voiced her support for Hillary Clinton in the 2016 United States presidential election.

Awards and nominations

References

Notes
 AdultInsider.com - interview with Misty Stone (2014)

External links

 
 
 
 
 

1986 births
African-American pornographic film actors
American female adult models
American people of Creole descent
American people of Muscogee descent
American pornographic film actresses
Actresses from Inglewood, California
Living people
Native American pornographic film actors
Penthouse Pets
Pornographic film actors from California
Crenshaw High School alumni
21st-century African-American people
21st-century African-American women
20th-century African-American people
20th-century African-American women